The Southern Nazarene Crimson Storm football program was established in 2000. Their home games are played at Southern Nazarene University's McFarland Park Stadium.  In 2007, the Crimson Storm won their first home opener game. Since 2012, SNU has been competing in the NCAA's Division II Great American Conference.

The head coach for the Crimson Storm is Dustin Hada. Other coaches include: Kenneth West (Assistant Head Coach, Wide Receivers), Indy Siehndel (Defensive Coordinator, Secondary), Nathan Brown (Special Teams Coordinator, Offensive Line), Stephen Price (Inside Linebackers), Scott Cooper (Tight Ends), Jake Owen (Offensive Graduate Assistant), Jared Howell (Defensive Graduate Assistant), James Love (Defensive Graduate Assistant).

Year by year results

Head coaching history
 Paul McGrady, 2000–2005
 Mike Cochran, 2006–2015
 Andy Lambert, 2016–2019
 Dustin Hada, 2020–present

See also 
 List of NAIA football programs

References

External links